Pierre-Julien Nargeot (14 January 1799 – 28 August 1891) was a 19th-century French violinist, composer and conductor.

Biography
Nargeot studied music at the Conservatoire de Paris where he was admitted at age 14 in October 1813. He was a pupil of Rodolphe Kreutzer for the violin and Auguste Barbereau, Jean-François Lesueur and Antoine Reicha for composition. In 1826, he obtained a first prize in counterpoint and fugue and in 1828 a second Second Grand Prix de Rome with the scene Herminie for one voice. There was no First Prize awarded that year. Only two candidates were rewarded: Berlioz, who was running for the third time, and Nargeot.

During his studies at the Conservatoire, Nargeot was a violinist in the orchestras of Opéra-Comique and Comédie Italienne. On 31 January 1826, he joined the Opéra. He would remain there until 1 September 1839 when he was appointed conductor at Théâtre des Variétés, boulevard Montmartre. In this venue were given comédies en vaudeville and bals, which attracted a Parisian audience hungry for entertainment. The Théâtre des Variétés took a real boom under the direction of Nestor Roqueplan who presented plays by Lockroy (Le Chevalier du Guet, 1840, On demande des professeurs, 1845, Les Trois coups de pieds, 1851), Alexandre Dumas (Halifax, 1842), Théophile Gautier (Le Tricorne enchanté, 1845), Eugène Labiche (Oscar XXVIII, 1848, Madame veuve Larifla, 1849, Un Monsieur qui prend mouche, 1852), Alfred de Musset (L’Habit vert, 1849), George Sand (La Petite Fadette, 1849) and operettas by Jacques Offenbach (La Femme à trois maris, 1853, Pépito, 1853). Thus Nargeot wrote many songs, tunes, quadrilles, rondes, inserted in these plays, especially in the Tricorne enchanté by Théophile Gautier (1845) and Le Lion empaillé by Léon Gozlan (1848). Some of these scores were real successes.

In 1853, Nargeot left the Variétés and joined, as violist, the orchestra of the Imperial Chapelle, which Napoléon III had just reopened. The director was Auber and the conductor Narcisse Girard. From 1828 to 1863, he was a member of the Orchestre de la Société des Concerts du Conservatoire.

He spent the rest of his life composing, trying to represent his operettas on stages of Parisian boulevards and died in Paris at age 92.

Main works
 Air varié pour violon avec accompagnement de piano
 Plaisir d'amour for violin
 Le Petit Messelin, scène lyrique by Théodore de Banville, Folies-Nouvelles, 1855
 Trois troubadours, scène lyrique by Étienne Tréfeu, Folies-Nouvelles, 1855
 Un Monsieur bien servi!, 1856
 J. Pifferari, 1858
 Le Docteur Frontin, 1861
 Les Contrebandistas, 1861
 La Volonté de mon oncle, comédie en vaudeville, 1862
 Les Exploits de Silvestre, 1865
 Un vieux printemps, 1865
 Dans le pétrin, 1866
 Jeanne, Jeannette et Jeanneton, 1876
 Les Ouvrières de qualité, operetta

References

External links
 Julien Nargeot on Data.bnf.fr 
 

1799 births
1891 deaths
19th-century classical composers
French conductors (music)
French male conductors (music)
French operetta composers
French Romantic composers
Musicians from Paris
19th-century French male musicians